Hickory Creek is a stream in Gentry County in the U.S. state of Missouri. It is a tributary of the Grand River.

Hickory Creek was named for the hickory trees lining its course.

See also
List of rivers of Missouri

References

Rivers of Gentry County, Missouri
Rivers of Missouri